Margaret R. Cote (also Margaret R. Cote-Lerat, August 2, 1950 – March 31, 2021), was a Saulteaux-Canadian educator, author, linguist, and historian. She is best known for her work concerning the preservation of Saulteaux language and culture, as well as being the first teacher in Saskatchewan to teach a First Nations language in a public school. According to Saskatchewan First Nations: Lives Past and Present, Cote "was the first person to teach a First Nations language in a public school".

Early life and education

Cote was born August 2, 1950, on the Cote First Nation, Saskatchewan, where she was raised. She was one of four children of John F. and Madelaine M. Cote. She grew up surrounded by Saulteaux culture and spoke the Saulteaux language until she began attending the Canadian Indian residential school system. Cote attended the Cote Day School and then the Fort Pelly Residential School (St. Philip's Residential School), where she attended grades one through eight. She attended Kamsack Junior High School for grade nine, she then attended the Qu'Appelle Indian Residential School (Lebret Indian Residential School) for grade ten. She finished her final two years through a vocational upgrading program by the Cote First Nation.

Cote acquired a Bachelor of Education at Brandon University in 1980. During her time at Brandon University, she attended Saulteaux language courses and worked as a language lab assistant and tutor. In 1990, Cote graduated from the Saskatchewan Indian Federated College with a degree in linguistics with distinction. She was one of the first three to do so, alongside Solomon Ratt and Billy-Joe Laboucan.

Career
In 1968, Cote began working with the Pelly Indian Agency office at the age of seventeen. From 1971 to 1978, Cote worked as a secretary and accountant for the Cote Band.

According to Charlene Crevier writing in Saskatchewan First Nations: Lives Past and Present, Cote "was the first person to teach a First Nations language in a public school". In 1979, Cote developed Saulteaux language curriculum guides during her time within the Indian Language Program at the Saskatchewan Indian Cultural College (now the Saskatchewan Indigenous Cultural Centre). Cote worked for the SICC as a sessional lecturer from 1982 to 1984. She went on to teach at the Brandon University and at the Kamsack Junior High School (now Kamsack Comprehensive Institute) in 1980, before moving on to teaching at the First Nations University of Canada. Cote was a member of the FNUniv faculty from 1980 until her retirement in 2010.

Cote published her first book, Nahkawewin Saulteaux (Ojibway Dialect of the Plains) in 1984. Throughout her career she published 20 books regarding Saulteaux language and culture. Her works Nahkawewin and Saulteaux Verb Book primarily concern Saulteaux semantic and morphological structure. Cote published 16 children's books for her Saulteaux Talking Books series. She also participated in the translation of four stories for CD-ROMs by Pebble Beach Interactive Fiction Inc. for Saskatchewan Education. A linguist, Cote presented within several conferences and workshops, including during the 33rd Annual Algonquian Conference on the Semantic and Morphological Structure of Saulteaux Conditional Sentences and Relative Clauses (2001).

Personal life
Cote's parents aided her in beginning to preserve the Saulteaux language. She eventually mentored her niece, Lynn Cote, to continue her work in preserving the language. Cote strongly believed in the importance of preserving First Nations languages and recorded 17 elders for the purposes of transcribing and translating as many narrative categories as possible.

While attending the Lebret Residential School, Cote met her first husband, Ivan Cote, with whom she had three sons and a daughter. Before she died, Cote was engaged to Andy Pascal and the couple planned to wed when the COVID-19 pandemic subsided. Cote's death was announced on Facebook on March 31, 2021. She was buried in the Cote First Nation.

Bibliography: List of works
1982: Nahkawētā : a Saulteaux language course 
1985: Nahkawēwin Saulteaux : Ojibway dialect of the plains 
1985: Nihso mahkwak 
1985: Saulteaux Verb Book 
1987: Conditional Sentences in Cree and Saulteaux
2008: Ānı̄n ēntōtamān kikis̆ēp 
2011: Nēnapohs̆ Āhtahsōkēwinan / Nēnapohs̆ Legends 
2019: posâkanacîweyiniwak : nitaskînân = The Touchwood Hills People : Our Land 
2021: Mācī-Anihšināpēmowin / Beginning Saulteaux 
Nahkawewin Workbook
Saulteaux Syllabics Book
Nahkawewin recordings
Saulteaux Talking Books series
First Edition Saulteaux Dictionary
Anihsinape-Apinoci Nakamowinan: Children's Saulteaux Songs and Nursery Rhymes

References

External links
National Centre for Collaboration in Indigenous Education interview with Cote

Indigenous Canadian women
Canadian indigenous women academics
First Nations women
First Nations women writers
Brandon University alumni
University of Regina alumni
Academic staff of the University of Regina
Linguists of Algic languages
1950 births
2021 deaths
Saulteaux people
First Nations academics
20th-century Canadian women writers
21st-century Canadian non-fiction writers
Canadian women non-fiction writers
Cote First Nation
21st-century Canadian women writers
20th-century Canadian non-fiction writers
Canadian women academics